Andreas Haider-Maurer was the defending champion but chose not to defend his title.

Florian Mayer won the title after defeating Maximilian Marterer 7–6(7–4), 6–2 in the final.

Seeds

Draw

Finals

Top half

Bottom half

References
Main Draw
Qualifying Draw

Cittadino Challenger - Singles
Maserati Challenger